A summary of 1819 in birding and ornithology.

Events
1819 to 1862 Feliks Pawel Jarocki takes over the organisation and management of  the Zoological Cabinet of the Royal University of Warsaw. In this year also he described the black-throated thrush.
Quinarian system proposed by the entomologist William Sharp Macleay . The system was followed by Nicholas Aylward Vigors and William John Swainson. 
William Bullock sells his collection. 
Coenraad Jacob Temminck acquires the bird collection of Johann Reinhold and Georg Forster which contained birds from the James Cook expedition. One is the Norfolk Island kākā another is the Tahitian sandpiper
Foundation of Swedish Museum of Natural History.

Ongoing events
Other birds  described by Vieillot in this work in 1819 are the chestnut-capped blackbird, the black-chested buzzard-eagle, the Chopi blackbird, Vieillot's black weaver, the giant wood rail and the boat-tailed grackle

Deaths
27 August - John Lewin (born 1770)

References

Birding and ornithology by year
1819 in science